Chaitanya or Chaithanya may refer to the following people
Given name
Chaitanya Bishnoi (born 1994), Indian cricketer 
Chaitanya Choudhury, Indian television actor and model
Chaitanya Krishna, South Indian actor
Chaitanya Lakshman (born 1968), Fiji Indian lawyer, social worker and politician
Chaitanya Mahaprabhu (1486–1533), Indian spiritual teacher
Chaitanya Charitamrita, a biography of Chaitanya Mahaprabhu
Chaitanya Bhagavata, a hagiography of Chaitanya Mahaprabhu
Chaitanya Singha Dev, 18th century king of the Mallabhum
Chaitanya Tamhane (born 1987), Indian film director

Surname
K. M. Chaitanya, Indian film director, documentary maker
Krishna Chaitanya (lyricist), Telugu lyricist, writer and director
Naga Chaitanya (born 1986), Indian film actor 
Nitya Chaitanya Yati, Indian philosopher, psychologist, author and poet